Hilda Gertrude Abbott (9 September 1890 - 26 May 1984) was the wife of the former Administrator of the Northern Territory, Charles Lydiard Aubrey Abbott. She is best known her contribution to the Northern Territory's Red Cross branch.

Early life

Abbott was born at Eucumbene station, near Adaminaby, New South Wales on 9 September 1890. She was the daughter of Australian grazier John Joseph Harnett.

Life in Darwin
Abbott arrived in Darwin, Northern Territory in 1937 with her husband Charles Lydiard Aubrey Abbott, who was the Administrator of the Northern Territory from 1937 to 1946. During that period she became known as the "First Lady". Hilda wrote numerous newspaper and magazine articles. In 1946 the Red Cross named one its buildings "Hilda Abbott Cottage" in her honour.

Hilda had previously worked for the Red Cross in Cairo. After moving to Darwin, she revived the local branch of the Red Cross, as its President.

She left for New South Wales in 1946. She explored and documented on film the Aboriginal cave paintings of Kimberley and Arnhem Land in the 1950s and 1960s, and lectured on Australian topics.

Abbott's diaries, "Good Night, All About: Reminiscence of life in Darwin and the Northern Territory 1937-1946", were published in 2015 by the Historical Society of the Northern Territory.

Darwin Red Cross
In Darwin the Red Cross is rendered war-time service to the members of the three services. Besides giving comforts to men in hospital, members of the Red Cross emergency service and help in the hospitals. Business girls de-vote several hours each evening to helping and enthusiastically attended.

References

1890 births
Red Cross personnel
1984 deaths
19th-century Australian women
20th-century Australian women